Michael Concio Jr. (born 2005) is a Filipino chess player. He was awarded the title of International Master (IM) by FIDE in 2021.

He qualified to play for the Chess World Cup 2021 where he was defeated 2-0 by Aravindh Chithambaram in the first round.

References

External links 
 
 Michael Concio chess games at 365Chess.com

2005 births
Living people
Filipino chess players